Carriçal is a settlement in the eastern part of the island of São Nicolau, Cape Verde. It is situated on the south coast, 8 km southeast of Juncalinho and 24 km east of Ribeira Brava. It is the easternmost settlement on the island. Some 8 km east is the island's easternmost point, Ponta Leste. The place was mentioned as Currissal in the 1747 map by Jacques-Nicolas Bellin.

See also
List of villages and settlements in Cape Verde

References

Villages and settlements in São Nicolau, Cape Verde
Populated coastal places in Cape Verde
Ribeira Brava, Cape Verde